Lincoln College of Law was a law college in Springfield, Illinois from 1911 to 1953.

In 1924, the Lincoln College of Law added a junior college program for training paralegals.

Notes

1911 establishments in Illinois
1953 disestablishments in Illinois
Educational institutions established in 1911
Educational institutions disestablished in 1953
Law schools in Illinois
Universities and colleges in Springfield, Illinois
Defunct private universities and colleges in Illinois
Defunct law schools